Artur de Sousa, known by his nickname Pinga (July 30, 1909 – July 12, 1963) was a Portuguese footballer and later coach who made his name at FC Porto, where he served until his death in 1963.

Playing career
Pinga played as forward or inside left and achieved nationwide fame at CS Marítimo. In 1930 he earned his first call-up to the national team, and in the same year joined FC Porto, and became the key player of the victories in the Campeonato de Portugal (the predecessor to the Cup of Portugal), in 1931/32 and 1936/37. He was still a playing for Porto when the forerunner of the current Primeira Liga was established, where he was champion in the first two years of the competition, in 1938/39 and 1939/40.

He retired in 1946 after a meniscus surgery, when such operations still carried many risks. During his career he was considered the best national player ever, scoring 394 goals in 400 games. He only played for two clubs, Marítimo and FC Porto.

International career
He was capped 21 times for Portugal, scoring 9 goals over 12 years (1930–1942). On 5 May 1935, Pinga scored two late goals against Spain to complete an iconic comeback, from 3-0 down up to 3-3. On 16 March 1941, he scored his last international goal against Spain in a 5-1 loss.

Coaching career
In his first season as a football manager, he caused a massive upset when Tirsense knocked out Sporting in the Portuguese Cup. He then managed Sanjoanense and Gouveia before returning to FC Porto as assistant manager.

He died in 1963, while serving as a youth team coach in Porto.

Legacy
He was idolized by José Maria Pedroto, who would become another major star in the Porto side. Both had their name suggested to the Estádio do Dragão. One of the most important sportsmen born in the Madeira Islands (some say his legacy lives on modern star Cristiano Ronaldo), he has a street named after him in his hometown Funchal.

International goals
''Portugal score listed first, score column indicates score after each Pinga goal.

Honours

Club
Porto
Primeira Liga (3): 1934–35, 1938–39, 1939–40
Campeonato de Portugal (2): 1931–32, 1936–37

Individual
Bola de Prata: 1935–36

References

External links

1909 births
1963 deaths
Sportspeople from Funchal
Portuguese footballers
Portuguese football managers
C.S. Marítimo players
FC Porto players
Portugal international footballers
Madeiran footballers
Primeira Liga players
Association football forwards